A by-thirds Hyndburn Borough Council local election took place on 7 May 2015. Approximately one third of the second tier council's 35 seats fell up for election, and the General Election was held on the same day.

Background
Before the election Labour had a majority of 23 councillors, Conservatives had 8 councillors, while Independent (politician) had 2 councillors and UKIP had 2 councillors.

Labour, Conservative and UKIP candidates contested for every ward, Green candidates only contested for five-wards and just one Independent candidate contested in the Church-ward.

Local Election result
The majority grouping of councillors was as the headline result of the election reinforced by two-seats, with independent councillors having lost their two (undefended) seats, and with no change to Conservative seats and where Ukip failed to gain any more seats:

After the election, the composition of the council was -

Labour 24
(Labour) Vacant 1
Conservative 8
UKIP 2

Reference: 2011 Hyndburn Borough Council election

NB: One of the previous 23 Labour council seats, in the uncontested-Spring Hill-ward held by Councillor Pam Barton, became 'vacant' when she died on 5 May. Councillor Barton was previously elected to the Spring Hill ward in the 2014 Local Borough Council election. The subsequent by-election date for this Spring Hill council seat was set for 9 July, following the death of former Mayor Pam Barton.

The four (out of 16) Hyndburn Local Borough Council ward seats that were not up for re election in 2015 included the following wards, Netherton in Gt. Harwood, Peel and Spring Hill in Accrington, plus St. Andrews in Oswaldtwistle.

Previous Councillors who were Standing-Down in this election included - John Broadley (Lab) (Church), Nick Collingridge (Ind.) (Clayton-le-Moors), Dave Parkins (Ind.) (Huncoat) and Brian Roberts (Cons) (St. Oswalds).

Ward by ward

Altham

Barnfield

Baxenden

Central

Church

Clayton-le-Moors

Huncoat

Immanuel

Milnshaw

Overton

Rishton

St. Oswald's

References

BBC Election 2015 England council results
Hyndburn Borough Council Elections - 2015
Accrington local election results 2015: Full breakdown from Hyndburn Borough Council

2015 English local elections
May 2015 events in the United Kingdom
2015
2010s in Lancashire